The Amazing Spider-Man 2 is a 2014 American film and a sequel to The Amazing Spider-Man.

The Amazing Spider-Man 2 may also refer to:
 The Amazing Spider-Man 2 (1992 video game), a 1992 video game
 The Amazing Spider-Man 2 (soundtrack), the soundtrack for the 2014 film, composed by Hans Zimmer
 The Amazing Spider-Man 2 (2014 video game), a 2014 game based on the 2014 film

See also
The Amazing Spider-Man (disambiguation)
Spider-Man (disambiguation)
Spider-Man 2 (disambiguation)